The Madonna and Child with Saints is the subject of several paintings by Cima da Conegliano:

 Madonna and Child with Saints (Cima, Berlin)
 Madonna and Child with Saints (Cima, Nivå)
 Madonna and Child with Saints (Fogg Art Museum)
 Madonna and Child Enthroned with John the Baptist and Mary Magdalene
 Madonna and Child Enthroned with Saint James and Saint Jerome
 Madonna and Child Enthroned with Two Male Saints
 Madonna and Child Enthroned with Two Virgin Martyrs
 Madonna and Child with Michael the Archangel and St Andrew
 Madonna and Child with Saint Catherine and Saint Nicholas
 Madonna and Child with Saint Francis and Saint Clare
 Madonna and Child with Saint Jerome and Saint John the Baptist
 Madonna and Child with Saint Jerome and Saint Mary Magdalene
 Madonna and Child with Saint John the Baptist and Saint Catherine of Alexandria
 Madonna and Child with Saint John the Baptist and Saint Francis
 Virgin and Child with Saints and Donors
 Virgin and Child with Saints (attributed to Cima)
 Virgin and Child with Saint Andrew and Saint Peter
 Virgin and Child with Saint Paul and Saint Francis
 Madonna of the Orange Tree
 Conegliano Altarpiece
 Dragan Altarpiece
 Montini Altarpiece
 Rest on the Flight into Egypt (Cima)
 Sacred Conversation (Cima, Milan)

See also
 Madonna and Child (Cima) (disambiguation)
 Madonna and Child with Saints (disambiguation)